Lozanne is a commune in the Rhône department in eastern France.

Its inhabitants are called Lozannais.

Geography
 There are 7 villages around Lozanne: Civrieux-d'Azergues to the East, Saint-Jean-des-Vignes to the North, Belmont-d'Azergues to the North-West, Châtillon-d'Azergues to the West, Fleurieux-sur-l'Arbresle to the South-West, Lentilly to the South and Dommartin (Rhône) to the South-East.
 There is a river flowing in Lozanne: Azergues.

Demography

See also
Communes of the Rhône department

References

Communes of Rhône (department)
Rhône communes articles needing translation from French Wikipedia